Onur Tuna (born 2 July 1985) is a Turkish actor and singer. He is known for his roles in Filinta, Yasak Elma, Bi Küçük Eylül Meselesi and Mucize Doktor.

Life and career 
Tuna was born in Çanakkale. His maternal is of Turkish origin who immigrated from Thessaloniki, Ottoman Empire (today in Greece). His mother is retired from the land office, his father is a teacher of mathematics.

He completed his undergraduate education at Dokuz Eylül University Faculty of Economics. He also studied Turkish classical music at Ege University Conservatory. Onur Tuna who knows how to play the guitar also has two songs called Acın Verdi and Tıpkı Sen. Onur Tuna has played licensed volleyball and basketball since the middle school years. He started to take part in theater plays in middle school and high school years. While studying at University in İzmir, he worked as a professional model for four years. He studied acting at Izmir Müjdat Gezen Art Center. When Onur Tuna settled down in Istanbul, he took private lessons for acting. Those acting pieces of training were containing method and front-camera acting skills. For this purpose, he worked with Ümit Çırak, Ayla Algan, Craft Theatre and Saim Güveloğlu.

His acting career started with Hayat Devam Ediyor (Life Goes On) Turkish TV series in 2011. Other TV series he took part in are Huzur Sokağı (Street of Peace), Filinta, Cesur Yürek (Brave Heart), Yasak Elma, and Mucize Doktor (Miracle Doctor).

Onur Tuna also acted in two movies in Turkey. In 2014, he played as an actor in Bi Küçük Eylül Meselesi Turkish drama film. Tuna continued his career with the TV series Cesur Yürek. He also was a leading actor in the movie Ağır Romantik (Heavy Romance or Severely Romantic). Tuna also played in a short film by Yadel Uzun titled Kir. In 2019, he started playing Ferman in Mucize Doktor, an adaptation of South Korean TV series Good Doctor. As of 2021, he shares the lead roles with İsmail Hacıoğlu in the Fox Türkiye series Mahkum, an adaptation of Innocent Defendant.

Filmography

TV series

Movies

Discography

EPs

Singles 
 "Yangın Yeri" (2019)
 "Bi' Hiçmişim Gibi" (2022)

References

External links 

Sinema Türk – Onur Tuna

1985 births
Turkish male television actors
People from Çanakkale
Living people
Ege University alumni